American recording artist CeCe Peniston entered the music industry as a backup vocalist on the Overweight Pooch's album Female Preacher, released in July 1991 on A&M Records. Shortly before that, she was featured on the B-side to 12-inch single "I Can't Take the Power" by male rapper Marvelous JC. Besides her vocal performance on the Pooch's only charting track, "I Like It", she was given a credit for co-writing two compositions; "Kickin' Da Blues" and the titular "Female Preacher". Soon after, the singer pursued a solo career. By now, Peniston has released four studio albums including one as a member of The Sisters of Glory, two remix collections, one live album, four compilations and one live extended play (EP). Her singles discography features twenty-nine physical releases, twenty-one digital-only, seven promotional recordings and twenty-six other appearances; regardless of their format. She has also been included on one video album and has made fourteen music videos.

Peniston recorded her own single "Finally" through A&M. The song was released in August 1991 and was followed by her full-length debut on January 28, 1992. Both the album and single of the same name, were certified Gold by the Recording Industry Association of America (RIAA) and the set itself by the Canadian Recording Industry Association (CRIA). They also earned two certifications from the British Phonographic Industry (BPI), respectively. By the time the album's local sales reached half a million copies, "We Got a Love Thang" and "Keep On Walkin'", would give her three consecutive number-one hits on the US Hot Dance Club Play, as well on the Canadian RPM Dance/Urban chart. Furthermore, each track reached the top-ten of Music Weeks singles chart in the United Kingdom, and the top-twenty of Billboards Hot 100 in the United States. The album itself broke into the top-forty music charts in Austria, Canada, the Netherlands and the UK, peaking home at number 70. Additional compositions from her first album, "Inside That I Cried" and "Crazy Love", scored successes in the R&B charts.

Her second studio set, Thought 'Ya Knew, saw its results on January 25, 1994. Having entered the top-forty only in the UK and Switzerland, the album somewhat failed to match the sales of its predecessor, reaching its peak in the Billboard 200 at position 96. It did, however, make an impact on the dance field, yielding two chart-toppers in the US. "I'm in the Mood", with its incorporated jazz elements, served as the album's pilot single. The latter singles, such as "Keep Givin' Me Your Love" released in the US a year after its European release, and "I'm Not Over You", those achieved top-5 statuses at least. While "Hit by Love", another house anthem, became the singer's fifth club number 1. As a result, she was named Billboard Magazine's #1 Dance/Club Play artist of 1994.

I'm Movin' On, the third album by Peniston, was released on September 9, 1996, and was viewed as a commercial failure. As such it thus did not achieve a presence in the official albums charts. Mid-tempo jam, "Movin' On" featuring rap by Suga T, reached number 83 and her so-called "vocal duel" with JoJo Hailey, "Before I Lay (You Drive Me Crazy)", missed the US Hot 100 altogether. In February 1998 Peniston experienced a late comeback in the overseas, when her remake of Jocelyn Brown's classic "Somebody Else's Guy" climbed to number 13 on the British singles charts; her highest top-100 entry in the island since May 1992. The remixes of the song were released on March 2, 1998 on her import greatest hits compilation The Best Of, her closing album on A&M. While the original version appeared on later collection of her hits, Essential, issued also overseas through Spectrum in 2000.

Subsequently, singer managed to record a number of singles, some of which garnered attention within their genre through various independent labels. Amongst them were three solo tracks such as "He Loves Me 2" (1999), "Lifetime to Love" (2001) and "Eternal Lover" (2004), as well her collaborations with other artists. These included "Reminiscin" with Saison (2001), "Deeper Love" with David Longoria (2005) and "Shame Shame Shame" with Soulshaker (2007). 

Since the 2010s, Peniston has released new material mostly in a digital format. While "Nothing Can Stop Me" (2014) received significant airplay on urban AC stations, "Believe" (2015), recorded with Chaos, happened to become her first entry on the US Dance chart in 10 years. One of her most recent releases, namely Purple Funk" (2017), almost topped the Hot Singles Sales component chart.

Albums

Studio albums

Remix albums

Live albums

Compilation albums

EPs

Singles

As lead artist

As featured artist

Download-only

Promotional songs

Other appearances

Videos

Video albums

Music videos

See also
 List of awards and nominations received by CeCe Peniston
 List of Billboard number-one dance singles 
 List of RPM number-one dance singles  
 Lists of UK top 10 singles

Notes

References

General
 
 

Specific

External links
 CeCe Peniston.com > Discography
 CeCe Peniston on A&M Records > US Discography

Discography
Discographies of American artists
Pop music discographies
Rhythm and blues discographies
Soul music discographies